Westchester Avenue is a major east-west street in the South and East portions of the Bronx, New York City. It runs from Third Avenue and 150th Street in the Hub to Pelham Bay Park in the Pelham Bay section. It crosses many neighborhoods of the Bronx, which include Melrose, Longwood, Soundview, Parkchester, and Pelham Bay. Westchester Avenue parallels the Bruckner Expressway until their junction at Pelham Bay Park.

The IRT White Plains Road Line runs over Westchester Avenue from Brook Avenue to Southern Boulevard and the IRT Pelham Line runs over Westchester Avenue from Whitlock Avenue to its terminus at Pelham Bay Park. The Bx4/Bx4A buses use Westchester Avenue between Bergen Avenue and Parkchester (Bx4A) or Westchester Square (Bx4) while the Bx24 uses Westchester Avenue north of Westchester Square. The Bx8 and Bx27 use the road for short segments.

References

Streets in the Bronx